is a passenger ship operating company in Yokohama.

Founded in 1953, the company operates seabuses, an excursion cruise ship, and a restaurant ship, all within the Port of Yokohama. The services include public lines listed below, as well as chartered ships.

Lines

Arrows (→) indicate ships only go that direction. Dashes (—) indicate ships go both directions. Lines are operated every day.
Yo: Yokohama Station East Exit
M: Minato Mirai 21 Pukarisanbashi Pier
PA: Pier Aka-Renga
Ya: Yamashita Park

 (Seabus)
Yo — M — PA — Ya
Yo — Ya
 (Excursion cruise ship)
Ya → (Port of Yokohama) → Ya
Ya → PA → (Port of Yokohama) → Ya → PA
Ya → M → PA → (Port of Yokohama) → Ya → M → PA
There are 40 minutes, 60 minutes, and 90 minutes courses.

 (Restaurant ship)
Ya → M → PA → (Port of Yokohama) → Ya → M → PA
There are 3 courses, namely Lunch Cruising (takes 90 minutes), Sunset Cruising (90 minutes), and Dinner Cruising (120 minutes).

Ships

Sea Bass
Designed for frequent passenger services between Yokohama Station and Yamashita Park. The ship is named Sea Bass, after the Japanese sea bass a fish native to local rivers and estuaries.
Marine Shuttle
An excursion cruise ship, mainly built for the observation tour of the Port of Yokohama. The ship is also often used for school excursions. There is a casual restaurant as well.
Marine Rouge
A restaurant ship, meaning a cruise ship mainly made for its restaurant cruise service. There are four dining spaces, and some observatory spaces. It is also possible to ride the ship without eating.

Stations

See also

Keihin Ferry Boat
Tokyo Cruise Ship
Tokyo Mizube Line
Water taxi

External links
 Official website

Ferry companies of Japan
Shipping companies of Japan
Companies based in Yokohama
Tourist attractions in Yokohama
Transport companies established in 1953
1953 establishments in Japan